The Imperial OPA Circus is a modern circus headquartered and operated out of Atlanta, Georgia.

Founded in 2009 by Timothy Mack, it currently contains a core company of 15 performers. In conjugation with its core philosophy, to be creative, to be inspirational, and to do good, the Imperial OPA Circus performs at local events to benefit nonprofit organizations such as Wish for Wendy, which benefits those with cystic fibrosis, and the Atlanta Hunger Walk, which benefits the Atlanta Community Food Bank.

Their first performance was an Atlanta local fundraiser to supply the East Atlanta Village with recycling cans. Their second performance, entitled "Cirque du Beaute", was on October 3, 2009 with Jyl Craven, a local hair studio. This was a fundraiser for the St. Jude's Children's Hospital of Atlanta.

References 

Circuses
St. Jude Children's Research Hospital
2009 establishments in Georgia (U.S. state)
Organizations based in Atlanta